Osmodes adonides is a butterfly in the family Hesperiidae. It is found in Gabon.

References

Butterflies described in 1971
Erionotini